Philippines's 7th senatorial district, officially the Seventh Senatorial District of the Philippine Islands, was one of the twelve senatorial districts of the Philippines in existence between 1916 and 1935. It elected two members to the Senate of the Philippines, the upper chamber of the bicameral Philippine Legislature under the Insular Government of the Philippine Islands for each of the 4th to 10th legislatures. The district was created under the 1916 Jones Law from the western Visayas provinces of Capiz and Iloilo. Romblon was added in 1917 upon its re-establishment as a regular province separate from Capiz.

The district was represented by a total of eight senators throughout its existence. It was abolished in 1935 when a unicameral National Assembly was installed under a new constitution following the passage of the Tydings–McDuffie Act which established the Commonwealth of the Philippines. Since the 1941 elections when the Senate was restored after a constitutional plebiscite, all twenty-four members of the upper house have been elected countrywide at-large. It was last represented by Ruperto Montinola and Potenciano Treñas of the Nacionalista Demócrata Pro-Independencia.

List of senators

See also 
 Senatorial districts of the Philippines

References 

Senatorial districts of the Philippines
1916 establishments in the Philippines
1935 disestablishments in the Philippines
Politics of Capiz
Politics of Iloilo
Politics of Romblon